Angelo Maria Rossi (also Pseudo-Fardella, or Pittore di Carlo Torre) was an Italian painter active in Lombardy in the 17th century. Rossi's work was originally grouped under the pseudonym 'Pseudo-Fardella', due to stylistic similarities with works by the Sicilian painter Giacomo Fardella di Calvello. From 1996, Rossi was also referred to as 'Pittore di Carlo Torre' on the basis of a signed pair of still lifes, painted in circa 1662 for Milanese writer Carlo Torre (circa 1620–79). It was only in recent years that Giuseppe Cirillo discovered the monogram 'A.M.R.' on various canvases ascribed to the artist and he was identified. Between 1665 and 1701, Rossi executed a number of paintings which are currently held in collections in Milan and Turin.

External links
 MutualArt

References

Italian male painters
Still life painters
17th-century Italian artists